The Taribelang  are an Aboriginal Australian people of central Queensland.

Country
Their territory also extended along the lower reaches of the Burrum River.

Alternative names
 Tarribelung.
 Daribelum.
 Darpil.
 Wokkari.
 Dundaburra.
 Bunda.
 Kalki.
 Butchulla. (Meaning: People By The Sea)
 Ginginburra
 Burrang
 Balguin
 (?) Yawai.

Notes

Citations

Sources

Aboriginal peoples of Queensland